Selişte or Seliştea may refer to the following places:

Romania
 Selişte, a village in Petriș Commune, Arad County
 Seliştea, a village in Cărand Commune, Arad County
 Seliştea, a village in Mileanca Commune, Botoşani County
 Seliştea, a village in Isverna Commune, Mehedinţi County

Moldova
 Selişte, Nisporeni, a commune in Nisporeni district
 Selişte, Orhei, a commune in Orhei district
 Selişte, a village in Cazangic Commune, Leova district
 Seliştea Nouă, a village in Tuzara Commune, Călăraşi district

See also 
 Selișteni (disambiguation)
 Selište (disambiguation)
 Selishte (disambiguation)